Mystic Energy is an album by the British Afro rock band Osibisa. It was released in 1980 by Calibre Records. It continued their shift towards R&B and away from the world music style they had debuted with. The elephant on the cover echoes the artwork of their earlier albums.

Critical reception
Newsday, reviewing a reissue, wrote: "The highlife elements in many of Osibisa's arrangements often gave the band's sound a manic, frantic density that overwhelmed the melodies. And yet the live version of Rahsaan Roland Kirk's 'Spirit Up Above' (on Mystic Energy) is a clear reminder that Osibisa's brand of Afro-jazz was right in line with albums like Miles Davis' Bitches Brew, as well as the Africa-inspired tracks on Stevie Wonder's Songs in the Key of Life."

Track listing

References

External links
 Discogs 

1980 albums
Osibisa albums